Lucio Luiz de Oliveira Gonzaga (born August 7, 1980 in São Paulo), known as just Lúcio Gonzaga, is a Brazilian soccer player who currently plays for Florida Tropics SC in the Major Arena Soccer League.

Career

South America 

Gonzaga was part of the youth setups at local Brazilian teams São Caetano and Juventus, and spent his early professional career playing in the lower divisions in Brazil and Uruguay, playing for RC Montevideo, Araxá, Rio Branco Andradas and São Caetano.

North America 

Gonzaga moved to the United States in 2007 when he signed with indoor soccer team Baltimore Blast. After helping the Blast to the MISL championship, he moved in 2008 to the XSL's New Jersey Ironmen.  Lucio spent one season with the Ironmen, scoring 23 goals in 19 games.  He was named the XSL Offensive Player of the Year.  Gonzaga returned to Baltimore and the Blast in 2009.

Gonzaga gained his first taste of outdoor soccer in the United States in 2009 when he played with the Real Maryland Monarchs in the USL Second Division. On February 11, 2010 Crystal Palace Baltimore announced the signing of Gonzaga to a contract for the 2010 season.  On September 14, 2010, Lucio signed a two-year contract with the Baltimore Blast.

Gonzaga signed with Florida Tropics SC on December 3, 2019.

Outdoor career statistics (in the United States) 

 (correct as of 15 August 2010)

References

External links 
 Baltimore Blast bio

1980 births
Living people
Brazilian expatriate footballers
Brazilian footballers
Real Maryland F.C. players
Expatriate footballers in Uruguay
Expatriate soccer players in the United States
New Jersey Ironmen (MISL) players
USSF Division 2 Professional League players
Brazilian expatriate sportspeople in the United States
Brazilian expatriate sportspeople in Uruguay
Associação Desportiva São Caetano players
Racing Club de Montevideo players
Baltimore Blast (2001–2008 MISL) players
Baltimore Blast (2008–2014 MISL) players
Major Indoor Soccer League (2001–2008) players
Clube Atlético Juventus players
Crystal Palace Baltimore players
Footballers from São Paulo
Major Indoor Soccer League (2008–2014) players
Association football midfielders
Utica City FC players
Major Arena Soccer League players
Ontario Fury players
Florida Tropics SC players